Pampus is a genus of fish of the family Stromateidae.

Species
 Pampus argenteus Euphrasén, 1788 (Silver pomfret)
 Pampus chinensis Euphrasén, 1788 (Chinese silver pomfret)
 Pampus echinogaster Basilewsky, 1855 
 Pampus liuorum J. Liu & C. S. Li, 2013 (Liu's pomfret) 
 Pampus minor J. Liu & C. S. Li, 1998 (Southern lesser pomfret)
 Pampus punctatissimus Temminck & Schlegel, 1845

References

Stromateidae
Taxa named by Charles Lucien Bonaparte